Nyala, also known as Dar Fur, Darfur Daju, Daju Darfur, Beke, Dagu, Daju Ferne and Fininga, is an Eastern Sudanic language of Darfur, Sudan, one of three closely related languages in the area called "Daju" (the other two being the Daju Mongo language and the Sila language). It is spoken near Nyala, the capital of South Darfur province by the Dar Fur Daju people. There are two divergent dialects: Nyala and Lagowa.

The Lagowa dialect of South Kordofan is spoken in Dar el Kabira, Jebel Miheila, Lagawa, Nyukri, Silecce, Tamanyik, and Warina area villages (Ethnologue, 22nd edition).

Phonology

Consonants 

 /p/ can also be realized as [f]
 /x/ is typically heard as [x] but is also heard as uvular [χ]
 /r/ can be heard as a trill [r] or a flap [ɾ] in free variation.

Vowels 

 Vowels /o, u/ can also be realized as [ɒ, ʊ].

References

Daju languages